Kumudini Mohapatra (1930–2006) was an Odia-language Indian author and translator from the state of Odisha. Her travelogue Americara Ghara O Gharani and science fiction Chandra Abhimukhe Abhijaan are a few of her popular works. Mohapatra was married to Gokulananda Mahapatra. She was active in Science-writing during 1947–1948.

Early life 
Mohapatra was married to Gokulananda Mahapatra. The couple had five children; Jyotshna, Girija, Rashmi, Snigdha, and Nanda Nandan.

References 

20th-century Indian women writers
1930 births
2006 deaths
Odia-language writers
Indian science fiction writers
20th-century Indian translators
Women writers from Odisha